Kelvin Poole (27 March 1958) is an Australian former cyclist. He competed in the individual and team pursuit events at the 1980 Summer Olympics.

References

External links
 

1958 births
Living people
Australian male cyclists
Olympic cyclists of Australia
Cyclists at the 1980 Summer Olympics
Australian track cyclists
Place of birth missing (living people)
20th-century Australian people
21st-century Australian people